The Heike Kamerlingh Onnes Prize was established in 2000, under the sponsorship of Elsevier, by the organizers of the International Conference on the Materials and Mechanisms of Superconductivity (M2S). The prize is named in honor of Heike Kamerlingh Onnes, who discovered superconductivity in 1911. At each conference, the prize, which consists of 7500 € and a certificate, is presented to one or more physicists. If there are two or more recipients they share the money. The prize "recognizes outstanding experiments which illuminate the nature of superconductivity other than materials". The winners are selected by the members of the Kamerlingh Onnes Prize Committee, appointed by the conference organizers.

The prize was first awarded in 2000 at the 6th International Conference on Materials and Mechanisms of Superconductivity and High Temperature Superconductors:

The prize is "one of the leading awards for experimental research in superconductivity."

Recipients
The following are recipients:

See also
 List of physics awards

References

Physics awards
Dutch science and technology awards
2000 establishments in the Netherlands
Awards established in 2000